Bongabong, officially the Municipality of Bongabong,  is a 1st class municipality in the province of Oriental Mindoro, Philippines. According to the 2020 census, it has a population of 76,973 people.

The town is home to Kuta Bongabong (Fuerza de Bongabong), one of the oldest Spanish colonial fortifications in the Philippines. The fort is in dire need of proper conservation. The only agency with the proper capabilities to restore the fort is the National Museum of the Philippines.

Geography

Barangays
Bongabong is politically subdivided into 36 barangays.

Climate

Demographics

Economy

Government

Elected officials

(2022-2025):
Mayor: Elegio Malaluan
Vice Mayor: Richard Candelario
Councilors:
Jayson Barcelona
Dolores de Gala
Niño Liwanag
Vicky Baes Padullo
Michael Malaluan
Maynard Panganiban
Comm Alfonso Montalbo
Evelyn Alea
Azor Mameng (Liga President)
Lovely Mae Anulao (SK Representative)
 Matigon Suligan (IP Representative)

Festivals

The annual activities in Bongabong are as follows:

 Feast of St. Joseph and Sulyog Festival, March 19
 Bongabong Foundation Day, December 7

Education
Colleges:
 Eastern Mindoro College
 Innovative College Of Science in Information Technology (ICST) - Bongabong, Oriental Mindoro
 Mindoro State College of Agriculture and Technology

High schools:
 Formon National High School
 St. Joseph Academy
 Labasan National High School
 Vicente B. Ylagan National High School
 Masaguisi National High School
 Dayhagan National High School
 Carmundo National High School
 Kaligtasan National High School
 Morente National High School
 Cawayan National High School

Elementary schools:

 Moises Abante Memorial Elementary School
 Formon Elementary School
 Orconuma Elementary School
 Magdalena Umali Suyon Mem. Elem. School
 Sebastian Umali Mem. Elem. School
 Iglicerio Lopez Mem. Elem. School
 Kaligtasan Elementary School
 Cupang Elementary School
 Anilao Elementary School
 Masaguisi Elementary School
 Mina De Oro Elementary School
 Dayhagan Elementary School
 Labonan Elementary School
 Camantigue Elementary School
 Bagong Bayan Central School
 Cawayan Elementary School
 Luna Elementary School
 San Jose Elementary School
 Carmundo Elementary School
 Batangan Elementary School
 Morente Elementary School

References

External links

Bongabong Profile at PhilAtlas.com
[ Philippine Standard Geographic Code]
Philippine Census Information
Local Governance Performance Management System

Municipalities of Oriental Mindoro